Merchant Marine Act can refer to:

 Merchant Marine Act of 1915, the Seamen's Act
 Merchant Marine Act of 1920, the Jones Act
 Merchant Marine Act of 1936
 Merchant Marine Act of 1970, co-drafted by Andrew E. Gibson